Shannon M. Zimmerman (born March 15, 1972) is an American businessman and politician.

From River Falls, Wisconsin, Zimmerman owns the Belle Vinez Vineyard and Winery since 2015. Zimmerman was founder of Sajan, Inc. (NASDAQ: SAJA). Zimmerman served in the Wisconsin State Assembly since 2017 and is a Republican.

Notes

External links
Wisconsin Assembly-Representative Shannon Zimmerman

1972 births
Living people
People from River Falls, Wisconsin
Businesspeople from Wisconsin
Chippewa Valley Technical College alumni
University of Wisconsin–Milwaukee alumni
Republican Party members of the Wisconsin State Assembly
21st-century American politicians